Shouting Secrets is a 2011 independent film directed by Korinna Sehringer. It premiered at Hollis Cinemas 4 in downtown Globe, Arizona on September 13, 2011.

The film has been nominated for and won numerous awards including Best Feature Film at the Rhode Island International Film Festival.

Plot
The film stars Chaske Spencer as Wesley, a young successful Apache novelist who left his family back in Arizona on the San Carlos Indian Reservation nine years earlier. His bestselling novel alienates him from most of his family, including his father Cal (played by Gil Birmingham), his brother Tuska (played by Tyler Christopher), and his sister Pinti (played by Q'orianka Kilcher), because of the autobiographical content. However, he remains close to his mother June (played by Tantoo Cardinal). When his mother suffers a stroke, Wesley finally returns to the reservation and must resolve his differences with his remaining family.

Cast
 Chaske Spencer as Wesley
 Q'orianka Kilcher as Pinti
 Tyler Christopher as Tushka
 Gil Birmingham as Cal
 Tantoo Cardinal as June
 Tonantzin Carmelo as Caitlyn
 Sheri Foster as Elaine
 Molly Cookson as Annie
 Connor Fox as Brody
 Ted King as Dr. James Matthews

Production
Shouting Secrets was written by Mickey Blaine, Tvli Jacob and Steven Judd.

References

External links
 
 Shouting Secrets Official Website

2011 films
2011 drama films
American drama films
Films about Native Americans
American independent films
2011 independent films
2010s English-language films
2010s American films